Uraloceras is an ammonoid cephalopod genus belonging to the goniatitid family Paragastrioceratidae.  The genus was named by Ruzhencev 1936 and is a jr. synonym of Pseudogastrioceras Spath 1930 according to Miller, Furnish and Schindeworlf, 1957.  More recent classifications however list the two as distinct genera and put Uraloceras in the  Paragastrioceratinae and Pseudogastrioceras in the Pseudogastrioceratinae.

Uraloceras, which comes from the Permian, is involute with a small to medium umbilicus and rounded venter. The shell is covered by longitudinal ribbing or coarse lirae. The suture, as characteristic of the family, has eight lobes, of which only the ventral one is bifurcate

References

Miller, Furnish, and Schindewolf, 1957. Paleozoic Ammonoidea. Treatise on Invertebrate Paleontology, Part L. Geological Soc. of America. R.C. Moore (ed)
 Paleobiology Database-Uraloceras 8/20/2010
GONIAT online 8/20/2010

Paragastrioceratidae
Goniatitida genera
Permian ammonites
Ammonites of Australia
Paleozoic life of Nunavut
Paleozoic life of Yukon